Heteronotia spelea, also known as Pilbara cave gecko, cave prickly gecko, or desert cave gecko, is a species of gecko. It is endemic to Australia.

References

spelea
Reptiles described in 1963